Danny Schenkel (born 1 April 1978) is a Dutch former footballer and current manager.

Playing career
Born in Amsterdam, Schenkel made his debut in professional football with the Telstar squad in the 1999–2000 season before joining Sparta Rotterdam in 2002. A tall and tough central defender, he had been a regular starter for them, scoring several mostly headed goals but also received the occasional red card.

For the 2008–09 season, he joined Willem II.

Management career
In 2019 Schenkel became the coach of the Ajax women He wom the Dutch cup in 2022.

Honours

Manager
Ajax
KNVB Women's Cup 2021-2022

References

External links
 Profile at Voetbal International 

1978 births
Living people
Association football defenders
Footballers from Amsterdam
Dutch footballers
Dutch expatriate footballers
SC Telstar players
Sparta Rotterdam players
Willem II (football club) players
AEK Larnaca FC players
AFC Ajax (amateurs) players
Eredivisie players
Eerste Divisie players
Cypriot First Division players
Expatriate footballers in Cyprus
VV Zwaluwen managers
Dutch football managers